Winston railway station served the village of Winston, County Durham, England, from 1856 to 1965 on the Darlington and Barnard Castle Railway.

History 
The station was opened on 9 July 1856 by the Darlington and Barnard Castle Railway. It was situated at either side of the B6274. It was referred to as Staindrop by the company before it opened. On the up platform was the station building and on the down platform was a waiting shelter. Opposite the up platform was the goods yard which had two sidings: one serving the goods yard and the other serving a coal depot. A third siding was added in 1894. It was referred to as Winston for Staindrop in 1937 and 1938 in Bradshaw and in every edition of the handbook of stations. The station closed to passengers on 30 November 1964 and closed to goods on 5 April 1965.

In the 1980s, whilst she was working as a television presenter, Wincey Willis lived on the site of the former station with her animals.

References 

Disused railway stations in County Durham
Railway stations in Great Britain opened in 1856
Railway stations in Great Britain closed in 1964
1856 establishments in England
1965 disestablishments in England